Covewood Lodge is a historic summer camp complex located at Big Moose Lake in Herkimer County, New York.  It was built during the 1920s and consists of the main lodge surrounded by 18 historic cottages.  The main lodge is a T-shaped rustic camp building built in 1924–25.  It is a two-story structure, built of logs and sheathed with vertically and diagonally laid planks.  It features a two-story verandah supported by massive tree trunks.

It was listed on the National Register of Historic Places in 2004.

References

External links
Covewood Lodge website

Clubhouses on the National Register of Historic Places in New York (state)
Buildings and structures completed in 1925
Buildings and structures in Herkimer County, New York
Tourist attractions in Herkimer County, New York
National Register of Historic Places in Herkimer County, New York